The Naval Mobilisation Department  also known as the Mobilisation and Movements Department  was a former department of the British Admiralty initially from 1909 to 1912 and then again from 1918 to 1932. It was mainly responsible for plans, mobilisation and manning during the pre-World War I and post war period.

History
In 1909, following restructuring within the Admiralty, both the Mobilisation and War Divisions of the Naval Intelligence Department were brought together to create a separate Naval Mobilisation Department however this department existed only for a period of three years. In 1912 it was abolished and its functions became a component part of the Admiralty War Staff sub staff divisions. In 1918 the Mobilisation Division of the Admiralty Naval Staff itself was dissolved and the Mobilisation Department was re-stablished once again but not under the control of the Naval Staff instead it was responsible to the Office of the Second Sea Lord this lasted until 1932 when it was replaced by a new Department of the Director of Manning that was itself a subsidiary department of the Second Sea Lord it continued to exist until 1964 when the Admiralty Department itself was abolished.

Directors of Naval Mobilisation
Directors of Naval Mobilisation, 1909-1912
Rear-Admiral Herbert G. King-Hall, 11 October 1909 - September 1911.
Captain Alexander L. Duff, October, 1911 - 1912.
Directors of Naval Mobilisation, 1918-1932 
 Rear-Admiral Edmond Hyde Parker, September 1918-December 1920. 
 Rear-Admiral George H.Baird, January 1921-January 1923. 
 Rear-Admiral John W. L. McClintock, January 1923-December 1924. 
 Rear-Admiral Robert N. Bax, December 1924-December 1926.  
 Rear-Admiral Rudolf M. Burmester, December 1926-December 1928. 
 Rear-Admiral Edward Astley-Rushton, December 1928-December 1930.  
 Rear-Admiral the Hon. Reginald Drax, December 1930-March 1932.

Assistant Directors
Assistant Directors of Naval Mobilisation, 1909-1912
Heads of Manning Division, 1909-1912
Captain Michael Culme-Seymour, October, 1909 - October 1910.
Captain Osmond de B. Brock, November, 1910 - 1912.

Heads of War Division, 1909-1912
Captain George C. Cayley, October, 1909 - December 1909
Captain Sydney R. Fremantle, January, 1910 - February 1911.
Captain George P. W. Hope, March, 1911 - 1912.

Assistant Directors of Naval Mobilisation, 1918-1932
 Captain George W. McO. Campbell, April, 1918  –  April, 1924.
 Captain Roger L'E. M. Rede,  April, 1924  – 4 April 1932.

Divisions and sub-sections
As of 1911: Distribution of work between the departments two divisions various sections can be seen in more detail below they included:

Manning Division

War Division

References

Attribution
Primary source for this article is by Harley Simon, Lovell Tony, (2015), Naval Mobilisation Department (Royal Navy), dreadnoughtproject.org, http://www.dreadnoughtproject.org.

Sources
 CB1515(50) [later OU 6171/31] The Technical History and Index (Part 50): Mobilisation of the Fleet. Demobilisation Records, 1918–19, written by the Mobilisation Department of the Admiralty, January 1921.
 Rodger. N.A.M., (1979) The Admiralty (offices of state), T. Dalton, Lavenham, .
 Hamilton C. I. (2011) The Making of the Modern Admiralty: British Naval Policy-Making, 1805–1927, Cambridge Military Histories, Cambridge University Press, 

Admiralty departments
1909 establishments in the United Kingdom
1912 disestablishments in the United Kingdom